Nikita Khokhlov (born 27 October 1983), is a Kazakh football midfielder. He currently plays for FC Okzhetpes. He is the alumni of PFC CSKA Moscow academy. Previously played for FC Astana and FC Ural Sverdlovsk Oblast. He has capped for Kazakhstan national football team 17 times as of September 2008.

Career statistics

International

Statistics accurate as of match played 27 May 2008

References

External links
 
  Profile Kazakhstan National team website

1983 births
Living people
Association football midfielders
Kazakhstani footballers
Kazakhstan international footballers
Kazakhstan Premier League players
FC Ural Yekaterinburg players
FC Aktobe players
FC Zhenis Astana players
FC Atyrau players
FC Okzhetpes players
PFC CSKA Moscow players